Dwayne Irving Sabb (born October 9, 1969) is a former American football linebacker and fullback in the National Football League, the XFL and the Arena Football League.

Early life
Sabb was born October 10, 1969 in Jersey City, New Jersey. Sabb graduated from Hudson Catholic Regional High School in Jersey City, New Jersey before attending the University of New Hampshire.

Career
After graduating from UNH, he was selected in the 5th round (116th overall) in the 1992 NFL Draft by the New England Patriots. A member of the Patriots from 1992–1996, Sabb appeared in Super Bowl XXXI, a Patriots loss to the Green Bay Packers. Following Sabb's NFL career, he played in various other leagues including the XFL (2001 with New York/New Jersey Hitmen) and the Arena Football League. With the Hitmen, Sabb was amongst the XFL leaders in sacks. In the AFL, Sabb spent 2001-02 with the New Jersey Gladiators, 2003 with the Buffalo Destroyers and 2004 -2005 with the expansion Philadelphia Soul.

References

1969 births
Living people
Sportspeople from Union City, New Jersey
Players of American football from New Jersey
American football linebackers
American football fullbacks
New Hampshire Wildcats football players
New England Patriots players
New York/New Jersey Hitmen players
New Jersey Gladiators players
Buffalo Destroyers players
Philadelphia Soul players